The Diadematidae are a family of sea urchins. Their tests are either rigid or flexible and their spines are long and hollow.

 Astropyga Gray, 1825
Astropyga radiata (Leske, 1778), extant
Astropyga pulvinata (Lamarck, 1816), extant
Astropyga magnifica (Clark, 1934), extant
Centrostephanus Peters, 1855
Centrostephanus asteriscus (Agassiz & Clark, 1907), extant
Centrostephanus coronatus (Verrill, 1867), extant
Centrostephanus fragile (Wiltshire in Wright, 1882), Santonian, Maastrichtian, Danian
Centrostephanus longispinus (Philippi, 1845), extant
Centrostephanus nitidus (Koehler, 1927), extant
Centrostephanus rodgersii (Agassiz, 1863), extant
Chaetodiadema Mortensen, 1903
Chaetodiadema granulatum (Mortensen, 1903), extant
Chaetodiadema keiense (Mortensen, 1903), extant
Chaetodiadema tuberculatum (Clark, 1909), extant
Diadema Gray, 1825
Diadema palmeri (Baker, 1967), extant
Diadema savignyi (Audouin, 1829), extant
Diadema setosum (Leske, 1778), extant
Diadema antillarum (Philippi, 1845), extant
Diadema paucispinum (Agassiz, 1863), extant
Diadema mexicanum (Agassiz, 1863), extant 
Diadema ascensionis (Mortensen, 1909), extant
Echinodiadema Verrill, 1867
Echinodiadema coronata (Verrill, 1867), extant  
Echinothrix Peters, 1853
Echinothrix calamaris (Pallas, 1774), extant  
Echinothrix diadema (Linnaeus, 1758), extant  
Eodiadema, Lower Jurassic  
Eremopyga Agassiz & Clark, 1908
Eremopyga denudata (De Meijere, 1904), extant  
Goniodiadema Mortensen, 1939
Goniodiadema mauritiense (Mortensen, 1939), extant
Kamptosoma Mortensen, 1903, extant
Palaeodiadema (Pomel, 1887), Santonian, Maastrichtian, Danian  
Pedinothuria Louis, 1897
Pedinothuria cidaroides (Gregory, 1897), Callovian, Oxfordian

Senses
Like other sea urchins diadematids are sensitive to touch, light, and chemicals; additionally they do have eyes (eye spots) which is in contrast to other sea urchins. Because of this they can follow a threat with their spines.

Images

References

 
Taxa named by John Edward Gray